Uttanahalli is a village near Mysore, India. 
 Uttarahalli is a suburb of Bangalore, India.